Doctor Creek is a rural locality in the Toowoomba Region, Queensland, Australia.

History
On Saturday 16 January 1892, a public meeting was called to plan the establishment of a school. In June 1892, tenders were called to erect a provisional school building. Doctor's Creek Provisional School opened on 30 January 1893 with picnic to celebrate its opening on Friday 10 February 1893. The first teacher was Mr Ridler. On 2 April 1900, it became Doctor's Creek State School. In preparation for the state school, tenders were called in June 1899 to erect a state school building and to convert the existing provisional school building into a teacher's residence. The school closed in 1963. It was at 327 Haden Peranga Road (south-west corner with Whites Road, now within neighbouring Haden). The school teacher's residence still exists on the site.

In 1903, St Paul's Lutheran church was established at 273 Haden Peranga Road (south-east corner with Whites Road, now within neighbouring Haden). The first Lutheran settlers came to the district in 1888 but it was not until 1902 that a Lutheran congregation was formed as part of the United German and Scandinavian Synod of Queensland. At the congregation's first meeting on 23 March 1903, it was decided to build a church. The church was dedicated on 29 November 1903 by Reverend George Heuer of Toowoomba, the president of the Queensland synod.

During World War I due to anti-German sentiment, the Lutheran church's pastor Reverend Gustav Fischer was interned from circa June 1916 to circa February 1919. Fischer was born in Australia as were his parents, but he was educated in Germany.

References

Toowoomba Region
Localities in Queensland